Lathial is a Bangladeshi film directed by Narayan Ghosh Mita. The film is the first recipient of National Film Awards. This film was awarded with 6 different categories including Best Film, Best Director, Best Actor, Best Supporting Actor, Best Supporting Actress, Best Art Director.

Plot
Dukhu Mia (Farooque) is a stage performer and his brother Kader Lathial (Anwar Hossain) works for Matbor (Obaidul Haque Sarkar). Dukhu beats Matbor's son Mokbul (A.T.M. Shamsuzzaman) for irritating Banu (Bobita) whom he loves. Matbor complains this to Kader and Kader beat Dukhu for this. This incident becomes the reason of dispute between two brothers. Dukhu leaves home at night and is found by Morol (Narayan Chakraborty) in the bank of river. Dukhu starts a new life there. Banu waits for him and finally one night he comes to meet her. By this time, Matbor sends proposal of marriage of Banu and Mokbul to Banu's father. Kader's wife (Rosy Samad) sends the news to Dukhu but he is going to claim a new river pirate. Matbor is also informed about river pirate at the wedding day. He sends Kader to claim it. Banu and Kader's wife also leaves for the new pirate to stop marrying Mokbul. Dukhu and Kader battles themselves to claim the pirate and all on a sudden Kader hits her wife who is trying to stop them. Then they stop fighting. By this time, Matbor comes and scolds Kader. Kader killed Matbor and announces the villages to own the pirate.

Cast
 Bobita as Banu
 Farooque as Dukhu Mia
 Rosy Samad as Kader's wife
 Anwar Hossain as Kader Lathial
 Narayan Chakraborty as Morol
 Obaidul Haque Sarkar as Matbor
 Rina Akram
 A.T.M. Shamsuzzaman as Mokbul
 Abdul Matin as Matin
 Rahima Khatun
 Abdus Sobhan
 Kazi Shafiq
 Zillur Rahman
 Dilip Chakraborty

Soundtrack
The music of this film was directed by Satya Saha and lyrics were penned by Moniruzzaman Monir and Gazi Mazharul Anwar. Abdul Jabbar, Sabina Yasmin, Syed Abdul Hadi, Khondoker Faruque Ahmed and Mohammad Ali Siddique sang in this film.

Awards

See also
 Cinema of Bangladesh

References

External links
 

1975 films
Bengali-language Bangladeshi films
1970s Bengali-language films
Films directed by Narayan Ghosh Mita
Best Film National Film Award (Bangladesh) winners
Films scored by Satya Saha